Theodore Bayard Fletcher Copp (May 22, 1902 – January 2, 1945) was a writer of adventure stories.

Biography
He was born on May 22, 1902 to Maude Evelyn Fletcher and Alfred E. Copp in Brookline, Massachusetts.

His mother died on January 1, 1945. He died in his sleep of a myocardial infarction on January 2, 1945, right after completing his mother's obituary.

Publications
The bridge of bombers (1941)
The mystery of Devil's Hand (1941)
The phantom fleet (1942)

References

1902 births
1945 deaths
American adventure novelists
American male novelists
20th-century American novelists
20th-century American male writers